The 29th Actors and Actresses Union Awards were held on 9 March 2020 at the Circo Price, in Madrid. The gala was hosted by Ana Cerdeiriña and Jorge Bedoya.
 
In addition to the competitive awards, Pilar Bardem received the '' award, Carmen Maura the '' career award and the writers' union ALMA the Special Award.

Winners and nominees 
The winners and nominees are listed as follows:

Film

Television

Theatre

Newcomers

International productions

References 

Actors and Actresses Union Awards
2020 in Madrid
2020 television awards
2020 film awards
2020 theatre awards
March 2020 events in Spain